The Huntington Library, Art Museum and Botanical Gardens, known as The Huntington, is a collections-based educational and research institution established by Henry E. Huntington (1850–1927) and Arabella Huntington (c.1851–1924) in San Marino, California, United States. In addition to the library, the institution houses an extensive art collection with a focus on eighteenth- and nineteenth-century European art and seventeenth- to mid-twentieth century American art.

History

As a landowner, Henry Edwards Huntington (1850–1927) played a major role in the growth of Southern California. Huntington was born in 1850, in Oneonta, New York, and was the nephew and heir of Collis P. Huntington (1821–1900), one of the famous "Big Four" railroad tycoons of nineteenth century California history. In 1892, Huntington relocated to San Francisco with his first wife, Mary Alice Prentice, as well as their four children. He divorced Mary Alice Prentice in 1906; in 1913, he married his uncle's widow, Arabella Huntington (1851–1924), relocating from the financial and political center of Northern California, San Francisco, to the state's newer southern major metropolis, Los Angeles. He purchased a property of more than  that was then known as the "San Marino Ranch" and went on to purchase other large tracts of land in the Pasadena and Los Angeles areas of Los Angeles County for urban and suburban development. As president of the Pacific Electric Railway Company, the regional streetcar and public transit system for the Los Angeles metropolitan area and southern California and also of the Los Angeles Railway Company, (later the Southern California Railway), he spearheaded urban and regional transportation efforts to link together far-flung communities, supporting growth of those communities as well as promoting commerce, recreation and tourism. He was one of the founders of the City of San Marino, incorporated in 1913.

Huntington's interest in art was influenced in large part by his second wife, Arabella Huntington (1851–1924), and with art experts to guide him, he benefited from a post-World War I European market that was "ready to sell almost anything". Before his death in 1927, Huntington amassed "far and away the greatest group of eighteenth-century British portraits ever assembled by any one man". In accordance with Huntington's will, the collection, then worth $50 million, was opened to the public in 1928.

On October 17, 1985, a fire erupted in an elevator shaft of the Huntington Art Gallery and destroyed Sir Joshua Reynolds's 1777 portrait of Mrs. Edwin Lascelles. After a year-long, $1 million refurbishing project, the Huntington Gallery reopened in 1986, with its artworks cleaned of soot and stains. Most of the funds for the cleanup and refurbishing of the Georgian mansion and its artworks came from donations from the Michael J. Connell Foundation, corporations and individuals. Both the Federal art-supporting establishment of the National Endowment for the Arts and the National Endowment for the Humanities gave emergency grants, the former of $17,500 to "support conservation and other related costs resulting from a serious fire at the Gallery of Art", and the latter of $30,000 to "support the restoration of several fire-damaged works of art that depict the story of Western culture."

On September 5, 2019, The Huntington kicked off a year-long celebration of its centennial year with exhibitions, special programs, initiatives, a special Huntington 100th rose, and a float in the 2020 Rose Parade in nearby Pasadena, California.

Management
The executive leaders of The Huntington Library, Art Museum, and Botanical Gardens are:
 President: Karen R. Lawrence
 Chief Financial Officer: Janet Alberti
 Chief Human Resources Officer: Misty Bennett
 Director of the Library: Sandra Ludig Brooke
 Director of the Botanical Gardens: James Folsom (retired), Nicole Cavender (May 17, 2021)
 Director of the Art Museum: Christina Nielsen
 Vice Presidents and other executive leaders: Heather Hart, Steve Hindle, Thomas Polansky, Randy Shulman, Susan Turner-Lowe, and Elizabeth (Elee) Wood

With an endowment of more than $400 million (and half a billion dollars raised between 2001 and 2013), the Huntington is among the wealthiest cultural institutions in the United States. It has undertaken major restorations and construction including a $60 million education and visitors center opened in 2015. Each year some 1,700 scholars conduct research there, and 600,000 people visit.

Library

The library building was designed in 1920 by the southern California architect Myron Hunt in the Mediterranean Revival style. Hunt's previous commissions for Mr. and Mrs. Huntington included the Huntington's residence in San Marino in 1909, and the Huntington Hotel in 1914. The library contains a substantial collection of rare books and manuscripts, concentrated in the fields of British and American history, literature, art, and the history of science. Spanning from the 11th century to the present, the library's holdings contain 7 million manuscript items, over 400,000 rare books, and over a million photographs, prints, and other ephemera. Highlights include one of eleven vellum copies of the Gutenberg Bible known to exist, the Ellesmere manuscript of Chaucer (ca. 1410), and letters and manuscripts by George Washington, Thomas Jefferson, Benjamin Franklin, and Abraham Lincoln. It is the only library in the world with the first two quartos of Hamlet; it holds the manuscript of Benjamin Franklin's autobiography, Isaac Newton's personal copy of his Philosophiae Naturalis Principia Mathematica with annotations in Newton's own hand, the first seven drafts of Henry David Thoreau's Walden, John James Audubon's Birds of America, and first editions and manuscripts from authors such as Charles Bukowski, Jack London, Alexander Pope, William Blake, Mark Twain, and William Wordsworth.

The Library's Main Exhibition Hall showcases some of the most outstanding rare books and manuscripts in the collection, while the West Hall of the Library hosts rotating exhibitions. The Dibner Hall of the History of Science is a permanent exhibition on the history of science with a focus on astronomy, natural history, medicine, and light.

With the 2006 acquisition of the Burndy Library, a collection of nearly 60,000 items, the Huntington became one of the top institutions in the world for the study of the history of science and technology.

On December 14, 2022, the library announced they had acquired the archive of American author Thomas Pynchon.

Research
Use of the collection for research is restricted to qualified scholars, generally requiring a doctoral degree or at least candidacy for the PhD, and two letters of recommendation from known scholars. Through a rigorous peer-review program, the institution awards approximately 150 grants to scholars in the fields of history, literature, art, and the history of science. The Huntington also hosts numerous scholarly events, lectures, conferences, and workshops.

In September 1991, then-director William A. Moffett announced that the library's photographic archive of the Dead Sea Scrolls would be available to all qualified scholars, not just those approved by the international team of editors that had so long limited access to a chosen few. The collection consists of 3,000 photographs of all the original scrolls.

Through a partnership with the University of Southern California, The Huntington has established two research centers: the USC-Huntington Early Modern Studies Institute and the Huntington-USC Institute on California and the West.

Art collections
The Huntington's collections are displayed in permanent installations housed in the Huntington Art Gallery and Virginia Steele Scott Gallery of American Art. Special temporary exhibitions are mounted in the MaryLou and George Boone Gallery, with smaller, focused exhibitions displayed in the Works on Paper Room in the Huntington Art Gallery and the Susan and Stephen Chandler Wing of the Scott Galleries. In addition the gallery also hosts different exhibitions of photography throughout the year including those about different social and political subjects.

European art

The European collection, consisting largely of 18th- and 19th-century British & French paintings, sculptures and decorative arts, is housed in The Huntington Art Gallery, the original Huntington residence. The permanent installation also includes selections from the Arabella D. Huntington Memorial Art Collection, which contains Italian and Northern Renaissance paintings and a spectacular collection of 18th-century French tapestries, porcelain, and furniture. Some of the best known works in the European collection include The Blue Boy by Thomas Gainsborough, Pinkie by Thomas Lawrence, and Madonna and Child by Rogier van der Weyden.

American art
Complementing the European collections is the Huntington's American art holdings, a collection of paintings, prints, drawings, sculptures, and photographs dating from the 17th to the mid-20th century. The institution did not begin collecting American art until 1979, when it received a gift of 50 paintings from the Virginia Steele Scott Foundation. Consequently, The Virginia Steele Scott Gallery of American Art was established in 1984. In 2009, the Virginia Steele Scott Galleries were expanded, refurbished, and reinstalled. The new showcase, a $1.6 million project designed to give the Huntington's growing American art collection more space and visibility, combines the original, 1984 American gallery with the Lois and Robert F. Erburu Gallery, a modern classical addition designed by Los Angeles architect Frederick Fisher. Highlights among the American art collections include Breakfast in Bed by Mary Cassatt, The Long Leg by Edward Hopper, Small Crushed Campbell's Soup Can (Beef Noodle) by Andy Warhol, and Global Loft (Spread) by Robert Rauschenberg. As of 2014, the collection numbers some 12,000 works, ninety percent of them drawings, photographs and prints.

In 2014, the library acquired the Millard Sheets mural Southern California landscape (1934), the dining room wall painting originally painted for homeowners Fred H. and Bessie Ranke in the Hollywood Hills of Los Angeles.

Acquisitions

In 1999, the Huntington acquired the collection of materials relating to Arts and Crafts artist and designer William Morris amassed by Sanford and Helen Berger, comprising stained glass, wallpaper, textiles, embroidery, drawings, ceramics, more than 2,000 books, original woodblock prints, and the complete archives of Morris's decorative arts firm Morris & Co. and its predecessor Morris, Marshall, Faulkner & Co. These materials formed the foundation for the 2002 exhibit "William Morris: Creating the Useful and the Beautiful".

In 2005, actor Steve Martin gave $1 million to the Huntington to support exhibitions and acquisitions of American art, with three-quarters of the money to be spent on exhibitions and the rest on purchases of artworks. In 2009, Andy Warhol's painting Small Crushed Campbell's Soup Can (Beef Noodle) (1962) as well as group of the artist's Brillo Boxes were donated by the estate of Robert Shapazian, the founding director of Gagosian Gallery in Beverly Hills. In 2011, a $1.75 million acquisition fund for post-1945 American art was established by unidentified patrons in honor of the late Shapazian. The first purchase from the fund was the painting Global Loft (Spread) (1979) by Robert Rauschenberg.

In 2012, the museum acquired its first major work by an African-American artist when it purchased a 22-foot-long carved redwood panel from 1937 by sculptor Sargent Claude Johnson.

Botanical gardens

The Huntington's botanical gardens cover  and showcase plants from around the world. Huntington worked to make them thrive in the generous California climate. Today his many projects of horticulture live on, providing opportunities for botanical research and for enjoyment. The gardens are divided into more than a dozen themes, including the Australian Garden, Camellia Collection, Children's Garden, Desert Garden, Herb Garden, Japanese Garden, Lily Ponds, North Vista, Palm Garden, Rose Garden, the Shakespeare Garden, Subtropical and Jungle Garden, and the Chinese Garden (Liu Fang Yuan 流芳園 or the Garden of Flowing Fragrance).

The Rose Hills Foundation Conservatory for Botanical Science has a large tropical plant collection, as well as a carnivorous plants wing. The Huntington has a program to protect and propagate endangered plant species. In 1999, 2002, 2009, 2010, 2014, 2018, 2019, 2020 and 2021, specimens of Amorphophallus titanum, or the odiferous "corpse flower", bloomed at the facility. There were a total of fourteen corpse flowers bloomed at Huntington since 1999. Three flowers opened in July, 2021.

The Camellia Collection, recognized as an International Camellia Garden of Excellence, includes nearly eighty different camellia species and some 1,200 cultivated varieties, many of them rare and historic. The Rose Garden contains approximately 1,200 cultivars (4,000 individual plants) arranged historically to trace the development of roses from ancient to modern times.

Chinese Garden (Liu Fang Yuan 流芳園)

A Chinese garden, the largest outside of China, was dedicated on February 26, 2008 after artisans from Suzhou, China spent some six months at Huntington to construct the first phase of the newest facility. On  at the northwest corner of the Huntington, the garden features man-made lakes ("Pond of Reflected Greenery" and "Lake of Reflected Fragrance") with pavilions connected by bridges. Unique Chinese names are assigned to many of the facilities in the garden, such as the tea house, known as the "Hall of the Jade Camellia". Other pavilions are the "Love for the Lotus Pavilion", "Terrace of the Jade Mirror", and "Pavilion of the Three Friends". The initial phase cost $18.3 million to build.

The second phase, which includes the "Clear and Transcendent Pavilion (Qing Yue Tai 清越臺)", "Lingering Clouds Peak (Liu Yun Xiu 留雲岫)" (with a waterfall), "Waveless Boat (Bu Bo Xiao Ting 不波小艇)", "Crossing through Fragrance" bridge and the "Cloud Steps" bridge, opened on March 8, 2014. There were other pavilions, including the "Flowery Brush Studio", and structures completed under phase two. A place to display its large collections of penjing and bonsai has completed.

Desert Garden

The Desert Garden, one of the world's largest and oldest outdoor collections of cacti and other succulents, contains plants from extreme environments, many of which were acquired by Henry E. Huntington and William Hertrich (the garden curator). One of the Huntington's most botanically important gardens, the Desert Garden brings together a plant group largely unknown and unappreciated in the beginning of the 1900s. Containing a broad category of xerophytes (aridity-adapted plants), the Desert Garden grew to preeminence and remains today among the world's finest, with more than 5,000 species.

Japanese Garden

In 1911, art dealer George Turner Marsh (who also created the Japanese Tea Garden at the Golden Gate Park) sold his commercial Japanese tea garden to Henry E. Huntington to create the foundations of what is known today as the Japanese Garden. The garden was completed in 1912 and opened to the public in 1928. According to historian Kendall Brown, the garden consists of three gardens: the original stroll garden with koi-filled ponds and a drum or moon bridge, the raked-gravel dry garden added in 1968, and the traditionally landscaped tea garden.

In addition, the gardens feature a large bell, the authentic ceremonial teahouse Seifu-an (the Arbor of Pure Breeze), a fully furnished Japanese house, the Zen Garden, and the bonsai collections with hundreds of trees. The Bonsai Courts at the Huntington is the home of the Golden State Bonsai Federation Southern Collection. Another ancient Japanese art form can be found at the Harry Hirao Suiseki Court, where visitors can touch the suiseki or viewing stones.

Other gardens
 Australian Garden
 Camellia Garden
 Children's Garden
 Conservatory
 Herb Garden
 Jungle Garden
 Lily Ponds
 Palm Garden
 Ranch Garden
 Rose Garden
 Shakespeare Garden
 Subtropical Garden

In popular culture

The Huntington Botanical Gardens were honored with a postal stamp as a part of the American Gardens stamps on May 13, 2020. The Desert Garden was featured.

The gardens are frequently used as a filming location. Footage shot there has been included in:

 Mame (1974)
 "Only Yesterday" (music video) – Carpenters (1975)
 Midway (1976)
 Beverly Hills Cop II (1987)
 Justice (Star Trek: The Next Generation) (1987) 
 Heathers (1988)
 "Ordinary World" (music video) – Duran Duran (1993)
 Indecent Proposal (1993)
 Beverly Hills Ninja (1997)
 JAG (1997), used as the White House rose garden
 The Wedding Singer (1998)
 Mystery Men (1999)
 Charlie's Angels (2000)
 The Wedding Planner (2001)
 The Hot Chick (2002)
 S1m0ne (2002)
 Anger Management (2003)
 The West Wing (2003), used as the National Arboretum 
 Intolerable Cruelty (2003)
 Starsky & Hutch (2004)
 Monster-in-Law (2005)
 Memoirs of a Geisha (2005)
 Serenity (2005)
 Ned's Declassified Field Trip, the final episode of Ned's Declassified School Survival Guide (2007)
 National Treasure: Book of Secrets (2007), used as the White House rose garden
 CSI Miami, in You May Now Kill the Bride (2008)
 G.I. Joe: The Rise of Cobra (2009), used during the flashback fighting scenes between ten-year-old Snake Eyes and Storm Shadow.
 "A Beautiful End" (music video) – J.R. Richards (2009)
 The Muppets (2011)
 Bridesmaids (2011), the driveway to Helen's bridal shower
 Parks and Recreation, used as Five Mile Grounds, the new Eagleton park, in the episode "Pawnee Commons" (2012)
 The Good Place, as the afterlife's fictional setting (2016–2020)
"Garden Song" by singer-songwriter Phoebe Bridgers mentions the Huntington by name.

Gallery

See also

 List of botanical gardens in the United States
 The Constance Perkins House, donated to the Library in 1991
 List of museums in California

References
Footnotes

Citations

Additional sources

External links

 
 Virtual tour
 Hathi Trust. Publications of the Huntington Library, fulltext, various dates
 

 
Art museums and galleries in California
Botanical gardens in California
Libraries in Los Angeles County, California
Museums in Los Angeles County, California
Art in Greater Los Angeles
Parks in Los Angeles County, California
San Marino, California
Sculpture gardens, trails and parks in California
Chinese gardens
Former private collections in the United States
Gardens in California
Historic house museums in California
Japanese gardens in California
Landscape design history of the United States
Literary archives in the United States
Open-air museums in California
Outdoor sculptures in Greater Los Angeles
Rare book libraries in the United States
Research libraries in the United States
Special collections libraries in the United States
San Gabriel Valley
San Rafael Hills
Libraries established in 1928
Museums established in 1928
1928 establishments in California
Elmer Grey buildings
Myron Hunt buildings
Neoclassical architecture in California
Tourist attractions in Los Angeles County, California
Greenhouses in California
Herb gardens
Gilded Age mansions